Kalaignar TV is a Tamil-language general entertainment pay television channel based in Chennai, Tamil Nadu, India. The channel was launched on 15 September 2007 as Kalaignar in respect of former Chief minister of Tamil Nadu M. Karunanidhi. Malaysia feed of Kalaignar ceased transmission on 1 June 2020.

History
The channel was launched by former Chief minister of Tamil Nadu M. Karunanidhi on 15 September 2007.

Programming

Channels 
The Kalaignar Network has introduced many channels to support views over public dominance within South Asia. They are:
 Kalaignar Seithigal
 Blacksheep TV
 Murasu TV
 Isaiaruvi
 Kalaignar Asia
 Kalaignar Sirippoli

References

External links
 

Tamil-language television stations
Tamil-language television channels
Television stations in Chennai
2G spectrum case
Corruption in Tamil Nadu
Dravida Munnetra Kazhagam
Television channels and stations established in 2007
2007 establishments in Tamil Nadu